

Day 1 (19 January)
 Day 1 attendance: 71,171
 Seeds out:
 Men's Singles:  Ernests Gulbis [11],  Tommy Robredo [15]
 Women's Singles:  Ana Ivanovic [5],  Angelique Kerber [9],  Lucie Šafářová [16],  Carla Suárez Navarro [17],  Anastasia Pavlyuchenkova [23],  Svetlana Kuznetsova [27],  Sabine Lisicki [28],  Belinda Bencic [32]
 Schedule of Play

Day 2 (20 January)
 Day 2 attendance: 64,801
 Seeds out:
 Men's Singles:  Fabio Fognini [16],  Alexandr Dolgopolov [21],  Julien Benneteau [25],  Pablo Cuevas [27]
 Women's Singles:  Flavia Pennetta [12],  Andrea Petkovic [13],  Jelena Janković [15]
 Schedule of Play

Day 3 (21 January)
 Day 3 attendance: 72,954
 Seeds out:
 Men's Singles:  David Goffin [20],  Philipp Kohlschreiber, [22]  Ivo Karlović [23],  Leonardo Mayer [26],  Lukáš Rosol [28],  Jérémy Chardy [29],  Martin Kližan [32]
 Men's Doubles:  Marcel Granollers /  Marc López [3],  Marin Draganja /  Henri Kontinen [15]
 Women's Doubles:  Chan Hao-ching /  Květa Peschke [8]
 Schedule of Play

Day 4 (22 January)
 Day 4 attendance: 
 Seeds out:
 Men's Singles:  Roberto Bautista Agut [13],  Gaël Monfils [17],  Santiago Giraldo [30]
 Women's Singles:  Caroline Wozniacki [8],  Samantha Stosur [20],  Casey Dellacqua [29]
 Schedule of Play

Day 5 (23 January)
 Day 5 attendance: 
 Seeds out:
 Men's Singles:  Roger Federer [2],  Richard Gasquet [24]
 Women's Singles:  Sara Errani [14],  Karolína Plíšková [22],  Zarina Diyas [31]
 Men's Doubles:  Rohan Bopanna /  Daniel Nestor [7],  Raven Klaasen /  Leander Paes [10],  Julian Knowle /  Vasek Pospisil [13]
 Women's Doubles:  Hsieh Su-wei /  Sania Mirza [2],  Garbiñe Muguruza /  Carla Suárez Navarro [6],  Kimiko Date-Krumm /  Casey Dellacqua [15]
 Schedule of Play

Day 6 (24 January)
 Day 6 attendance: 81,031 
 Seeds out:
 Men's Singles:  Gilles Simon [18],  John Isner [19],  Fernando Verdasco [31]
 Women's Singles:  Petra Kvitová [4],  Alizé Cornet [19],  Barbora Záhlavová-Strýcová [25],  Elina Svitolina [26],  Varvara Lepchenko [30]
 Men's Doubles:  Alexander Peya /  Bruno Soares [5],  Robert Lindstedt /  Marcin Matkowski [9],  Juan Sebastián Cabal /  Robert Farah [11]
 Women's Doubles:  Tímea Babos /  Kristina Mladenovic [10],  Anabel Medina Garrigues /  Yaroslava Shvedova [11]
 Mixed Doubles:  Yaroslava Shvedova /  Nenad Zimonjić [6]
 Schedule of Play

Day 7 (25 January)
 Day 7 attendance: 
 Seeds out:
 Men's Singles:  Grigor Dimitrov [10],  Kevin Anderson [14]
 Women's Singles:  Peng Shuai [21]
 Men's Doubles:  Aisam-ul-Haq Qureshi /  Nenad Zimonjić [8]
 Women's Doubles:  Andrea Hlaváčková /  Lucie Hradecká [9],  Alla Kudryavtseva /  Anastasia Pavlyuchenkova [12]
 Mixed Doubles:  Květa Peschke /  Marcin Matkowski [8]
 Schedule of Play

Day 8 (26 January)
 Day 8 attendance: 
 Seeds out:
 Men's Singles:  David Ferrer [9],  Feliciano López [12]
 Women's Singles:  Agnieszka Radwańska [6],  Garbiñe Muguruza [24]
 Men's Doubles:  Bob Bryan /  Mike Bryan [1],  Eric Butorac /  Samuel Groth [12],  Jamie Murray /  John Peers [16]
 Women's Doubles:  Sara Errani /  Roberta Vinci [1],  Martina Hingis /  Flavia Pennetta [4],  Caroline Garcia /  Katarina Srebotnik [7] 
 Schedule of Play

Day 9 (27 January)
 Day 9 attendance: 
 Seeds out:
 Men's Singles:  Rafael Nadal [3]
 Women's Singles:  Simona Halep [3],  Eugenie Bouchard [7]
 Men's Doubles:  Julien Benneteau /  Édouard Roger-Vasselin [2]
 Women's Doubles:  Ekaterina Makarova /  Elena Vesnina [3],  Raquel Kops-Jones /  Abigail Spears [5]
 Schedule of Play

Day 10 (28 January)
 Day 10 attendance: 
 Seeds out:
 Men's Singles:  Kei Nishikori [5],  Milos Raonic [8]
 Women's Singles:  Dominika Cibulková [11],  Venus Williams [18]
 Men's Doubles:  Dominic Inglot /  Florin Mergea [14]
 Women's Doubles:  Michaëlla Krajicek /  Barbora Záhlavová-Strýcová [13],  Julia Görges /  Anna-Lena Grönefeld [16]
 Mixed Doubles:  Andrea Hlaváčková /  Alexander Peya [4]
 Schedule of Play

Day 11 (29 January)
 Day 11 attendance: 
 Seeds out:
 Men's Singles:  Tomáš Berdych [7]
 Women's Singles:  Ekaterina Makarova [10]
 Men's Doubles:  Ivan Dodig /  Marcelo Melo [4],  Jean-Julien Rojer /  Horia Tecău [6]
 Mixed Doubles:  Katarina Srebotnik /  Marcelo Melo [2],  Cara Black /  Juan Sebastián Cabal [5]
 Schedule of Play

Day 12 (30 January)
 Day 12 attendance: 
 Seeds out:
 Men's Singles:  Stan Wawrinka [4]
 Women's Doubles:  Chan Yung-jan /  Zheng Jie [14]
 Mixed Doubles:  Sania Mirza /  Bruno Soares [1]
 Schedule of Play

Day 13 (31 January)
 Day 13 attendance: 
 Seeds out:
 Women's Singles:  Maria Sharapova [2]
 Schedule of Play

Day 14 (1 February)
 Day 14 attendance: 
 Seeds out:
 Men's Singles:  Andy Murray [6]
 Mixed Doubles:  Kristina Mladenovic /  Daniel Nestor [3]
 Schedule of Play

Day-by-day summaries
Australian Open (tennis) by year – Day-by-day summaries